Eric Grothe may refer to:
Eric Grothe Sr., Australian former professional rugby league footballer
Eric Grothe Jr., Australian former professional rugby league footballer and son of above